The University of Montana Grizzlies women's basketball team, known as the Lady Griz is an NCAA Division I college women's basketball team competing in the Big Sky Conference. Home games are played at Dahlberg Arena located inside the University of Montana's Adams Center.

Current roster

Postseason results

NCAA Division I
The Lady Griz have appeared in 20 NCAA tournaments with all of them occurring under coach Robin Selvig.  In 25 games, they have a 6–19 record.

AIAW Division I
The Lady Griz made one appearance in the AIAW National Division I basketball tournament, with a combined record of 0–1.

Season by season records

NCAA tournament results
The Lady Griz have appeared in 21 NCAA tournaments, with a record of 6-21.

References

External links